The year 2009 is the 11th year in the history of King of the Cage, a mixed martial arts promotion based in the United States. In 2009 King of the Cage held 37 events, KOTC: Fusion.

Title fights

Events list

KOTC: Fusion

KOTC: Fusion was an event held on January 17, 2009, at the Soaring Eagle Casino in Mount Pleasant, Michigan.

Results

KOTC: Impulse

KOTC: Impulse was an event held on January 17, 2009, at the Chevrolet Centre in Youngstown, Ohio.

Results

KOTC: Hurricane

KOTC: Hurricane was an event held on February 21, 2009, at War Memorial Auditorium in Fort Lauderdale, Florida.

Results

KOTC: Immortal

KOTC: Immortal was an event held on February 26, 2009, at San Manuel Casino in Highland, California.

Results

KOTC: Northern Lights

KOTC: Northern Lights was an event held on February 29, 2009, at Northern Lights Casino in Walker, Minnesota.

Results

KOTC: Rapture

KOTC: Rapture was an event held on February 28, 2009, at Ute Mountain Casino in Towaoc, Colorado.

Results

KOTC: New Breed

KOTC: New Breed was an event held on March 7, 2009, at the Inn of the Mountain Gods Resort and Casino in Mescalero, New Mexico.

Results

KOTC: Last Resort

KOTC: Last Resort was an event held on March 14, 2009, at the Avi Resort and Casino in Laughlin, Nevada.

Results

KOTC: Dividing Lines

KOTC: Dividing Lines was an event held on March 14, 2009, at the Kewadin Casino in Sault Ste. Marie, Michigan.

Results

KOTC: Border Wars

KOTC: Border Wars was an event held on March 21, 2009, at the MBT Expo Center in Monroe, Michigan.

Results

KOTC: Invincible

KOTC: Invincible was an event held on March 27, 2009, at the Georgia International Convention Center in Atlanta, Georgia.

Results

KOTC: Insanity

KOTC: Insanity was an event held on April 4, 2009, at Lake of the Torches Casino in Lac du Flambeau, Wisconsin.

Results

KOTC: Battle on the Bay

KOTC: Battle on the Bay was an event held on April 18, 2009, at Leelanau Sands Casino in Peshawbestown, Michigan.

Results

KOTC: Storm

KOTC: Storm was an event held on May 16, 2009, at Diamond Stadium in Lake Elsinore, California.

Results

KOTC: El Lobo

KOTC: El Lobo was an event held on May 23, 2009, at Ute Mountain Casino in Towaoc, Colorado.

Results

KOTC: Retribution II

KOTC: Retribution II was an event held on May 30, 2009, at the Inn of the Mountain Gods Resort and Casino in Mescalero, New Mexico.

Results

KOTC: Legends

KOTC: Legends was an event held on June 6, 2009, at Quechan Casino in Winterhaven, California.

Results

KOTC: Militia

KOTC: Militia was an event held on June 11, 2009, at San Manuel Casino in San Bernardino, California.

Results

KOTC: Encore

KOTC: Encore was an event held on June 19, 2009, at Soaring Eagle Casino in Mount Pleasant, Michigan.

Results

KOTC: The Renewal

KOTC: The Renewal was an event held on June 20, 2009, at Tyndall Armory in Indianapolis, Indiana.

Results

KOTC: Connection

KOTC: Connection was an event held on July 18, 2009, at Lake of the Torches Casino in Lac du Flambeau, Wisconsin.

Results

KOTC: Disputed

KOTC: Disputed was an event held on July 25, 2009, at Kewadin Casino in Sault Ste. Marie, Michigan.

Results

KOTC: Gate Keeper

KOTC: Gate Keeper was an event held on August 1, 2009, at the Inn of the Mountain Gods Resort and Casino in Mescalero, New Mexico.

Results

KOTC: Gunslinger

KOTC: Gunslinger was an event held on August 8, 2009, at Lucky Star Casino in Concho, Oklahoma.

Results

KOTC: Super Stars

KOTC: Super Stars was an event held on August 13, 2009, at San Manuel Casino in Highland, California.

Results

KOTC: Thunderstruck

KOTC: Thunderstruck was an event held on August 15, 2009, at Comcast Arena in Everett, Washington.

Results

KOTC: Eruption

KOTC: Eruption was an event held on August 29, 2009, at Leelanau Sands Casino in Peshawbestown, Michigan.

Results

KOTC: Turmoil

KOTC: Turmoil was an event held on September 5, 2009, at Northern Lights Casino in Walker, Minnesota.

Results

KOTC: Forged Steel

KOTC: Forged Steel was an event held on September 26, 2009, at Ute Mountain Casino in Cortez, Colorado.

Results

KOTC: Distorted

KOTC: Distorted was an event held on October 1, 2009, at San Manuel Casino in Highland, California.

Results

KOTC: Jolted

KOTC: Jolted was an event held on October 3, 2009, at Avi Resort and Casino in Laughlin, Nevada.

Results

KOTC: Strike Point

KOTC: Strike Point was an event held on October 10, 2009, at Lake of the Torches Casino in Lac du Flambeau, Wisconsin.

Results

KOTC: Rip Tide

KOTC: Rip Tide was an event held on October 10, 2009, at Quinault Beach Resort and Casino in Ocean Shores, Washington.

Results

KOTC: Wreckage

KOTC: Wreckage was an event held on October 30, 2009, at Lucky Star Casino in Clinton, Oklahoma.

Results

KOTC: Horse Power

KOTC: Horse Power was an event held on November 28, 2009, at the Inn of the Mountain Gods Resort and Casino in Mescalero, New Mexico.

Results

KOTC: Title Defense

KOTC: Title Defense was an event held on December 12, 2009, at Kewadin Casino in Sault Ste. Marie, Michigan.

Results

KOTC: Fight 4 Hope

KOTC: Fight 4 Hope was an event held on December 17, 2009, at San Manuel Casino in Highland, California.

Results

See also 
 List of King of the Cage events
 List of King of the Cage champions

References

King of the Cage events
2009 in mixed martial arts